Mythology: Timeless Tales of Gods and Heroes is a book written by Edith Hamilton, published in 1942 by Little, Brown and Company.  It has been reissued since then by several publishers, including its 75th anniversary illustrated edition. It retells stories of Greek, Roman, and Norse mythology drawn from a variety of sources. The introduction includes commentary on the major classical poets used as sources, and on how changing cultures have led to changing characterizations of the deities and their myths. It is frequently used in high schools and colleges as an introductory text to ancient mythology and belief.

Contents 
The book contains an introduction and seven sections:
Greek gods of Olympus and the Greek creation myths
Greek and Roman myths involving love and adventure, including the tales of Eros and Psyche and Jason's quest for the Golden Fleece
Heroes before the Trojan War, such as Perseus, Theseus, Heracles and Atalanta
Trojan War and its heroes, including Odysseus, Aeneas and Achilles
Significant families in Greek mythology: the house of Atreus, the royal house of Thebes, and the royal house of Athens
Lesser-known stories from Greek and Roman mythology
Tales from Norse myths involving deities such as Odin, Thor and Loki

Most editions include drawings by American illustrator Steele Savage.

References 

1942 books
Mythology books